Peter John Hampton (12 September 195425 September 2020) was an English footballer who played as a left back in the Football League for Leeds United, Stoke City, Burnley, Rochdale and Carlisle United.

Career
Hampton was born in Oldham and almost joined Manchester City on junior terms before his family moved to Bishop Auckland when he was ten years old.  He joined Leeds United in September 1971, having played at international level with England Schools. He made his professional debut at the end of the 1972–73 season but struggled to get back into the side due to the form of Terry Cooper, Trevor Cherry and Frank Gray. Hampton spent the next three seasons in the reserves, making few appearances in the first team, but was an unused substitute in the 1975 European Cup Final. He finally had a run in the side in 1976–77, playing in 36 matches, but he was unable to hold on to his place and joined Stoke City in August 1980 for a fee of £175,000.

Under the management of Alan Durban at Stoke, Hampton enjoyed regular first team football for the first time in his career. He made 37 appearances in 1980–81, 36 in 1981–82, 45 in 1982–83 and 38 in 1983–84. After spending four seasons at the Victoria Ground making a total of 156 appearances Bill Asprey sold him to Third Division Burnley. His first season at Turf Moor ended with the Clarets being relegated to the Fourth Division. He spent two seasons with the club in the bottom tier before spending a short time at Rochdale and Carlisle United.

Hampton later was Carlisle United's physiotherapist for eleven years, and later was manager of non-league Workington from 1998 to 2001.

After football 
After leaving Workington in 2001 he opened his own private physiotherapy practice, was part of Carlisle's youth team staff, and also worked as a sales executive for a sportswear firm.

Hampton died, aged 66, on 25 September 2020 whilst on a family holiday in Cyprus. He had recently retired after working at Cumberland Infirmary.

His grandson Joe White is also a footballer.

Career statistics

References

External links
 
 Peter Hampton interview at the Yorkshire Evening Post

1954 births
2020 deaths
People from Oldham
English footballers
Footballers from Oldham
Association football defenders
Leeds United F.C. players
Stoke City F.C. players
Burnley F.C. players
Rochdale A.F.C. players
Carlisle United F.C. players
English football managers
Workington A.F.C. managers
Bury F.C. non-playing staff
Association football physiotherapists
English Football League players
Carlisle United F.C. non-playing staff